These are the official results of the Men's 110 metres hurdles event at the 1994 European Championships in Helsinki, Finland, held at Helsinki Olympic Stadium on 11 and 12 August 1994.

Medalists

Final
Held on 12 August 1994
Wind: 1.1 m/s

Semifinals
Held on 12 August 1994
Wind: 1.0 m/s

Wind: 0.1 m/s

Qualifying heats
Held on 11 August 1994
Wind: 0.7 m/s

Wind: 1.5 m/s

Wind: 1.3 m/s

Wind: -0.1 m/s

Participation
According to an unofficial count, 31 athletes from 18 countries participated in the event.

 (1)
 (1)
 (2)
 (3)
 (3)
 (3)
 (2)
 (2)
 (1)
 (1)
 (1)
 (1)
 (1)
 (1)
 (3)
 (1)
 (1)
 (3)

See also
 1990 Men's European Championships 110m Hurdles (Split)
 1991 Men's World Championships 110m Hurdles (Tokyo)
 1992 Men's Olympic 110m Hurdles (Barcelona)
 1993 Men's World Championships 110m Hurdles (Stuttgart)
 1995 Men's World Championships 110m Hurdles (Gothenburg)
 1996 Men's Olympic 110m Hurdles (Atlanta)
 1997 Men's World Championships 110m Hurdles (Athens)
 1998 Men's European Championships 110m Hurdles (Budapest)

References

 Results

Hurdles 110
Sprint hurdles at the European Athletics Championships